All That You Possess is a Canadian drama film, released in 2012. Written and directed by Bernard Émond, the film stars Patrick Drolet as Pierre Leduc, a doctoral student and university lecturer in Quebec City who dreams of abandoning his academic career to translate the poetry of Edward Stachura.

The film garnered three nominations at the 1st Canadian Screen Awards, including Best Director and Best Original Screenplay nods for Émond and Best Actor for Drolet.

References

External links

2012 films
Canadian drama films
Films directed by Bernard Émond
Films set in Quebec City
2012 drama films
2010s French-language films
French-language Canadian films
2010s Canadian films